Ernesto Gutiérrez (born 9 November 1927) was an Argentine footballer. He played in 22 matches for the Argentina national football team from 1947 to 1956. He was also part of Argentina's squad for the 1947 South American Championship.

References

External links
 

1927 births
Possibly living people
Argentine footballers
Argentina international footballers
Place of birth missing (living people)
Association football midfielders
Ferro Carril Oeste footballers
Racing Club de Avellaneda footballers
RC Celta de Vigo players
Argentinos Juniors footballers
Argentine expatriate footballers
Expatriate footballers in Spain